The F67 type, also known as the Tourville class was a class of large high-sea (blue water) Frigates of the French Navy specialised in anti-submarine warfare. They had anti-air and anti-surface capabilities.

Between 1994 and 1996, Tourville and De Grasse were refitted with the modern SLASM anti-submarine system, and active Very Low Frequency (VLF) sonar.

Design

The ships are an enlarged version of the frigate Aconit. They have two shaft steam turbine machinery and a double hangar for two Lynx WG13 helicopters. They were the first ships fitted with the marine version of the Crotale surface-to-air missile system. A Malafon anti-submarine missile system was fitted when the ships were built but this was removed during refits in the late 1980s.

Optimized for anti-submarine warfare, and carrying towed as well as hull-mounted sonar arrays, the Tourvilles were typically placed in the destroyer category of warship and carry destroyer pennant numbers. Similar in many regards to the unmodified  destroyers, they carried a similar combination of sensors, naval guns, anti-ship and anti-submarine weapons, aircraft and surface-to-air missiles. Additionally, they were well-regarded for their seakeeping, serving much of their careers in the Atlantic rather than with France's Mediterranean fleet.

Ships

The three ships of the class, D612 De Grasse, D611 Duguay-Trouin and D610 Tourville, are named major figures from French naval history. De Grasse and Tourville were French admirals and Duguay-Trouin coming to fame as a privateer.

The three ships of the class were all constructed by Arsenal de Lorient.

Notes

References

 Gardiner, Robert; Chumbley, Stephen & Budzbon, Przemysław (1995). Conway's All the World's Fighting Ships 1947-1995. Annapolis, Maryland: Naval Institute Press. .

Destroyer classes
Frigate classes
 
 
Ship classes of the French Navy